Jimi Bellmartin (29 January 1949 – 28 May 2021) was a Dutch singer of Moluccan descent.

Early life
Bellmartin was born in Bogor, Indonesia on January 29, 1949. He moved to Den Bosch in the Netherlands at the age of 1.

Career
Bellmartin released his first single called This is my lovesong / The winter of my life in 1970.

In 2007, Bellmartin started as the singer of a funk band called The Soul Snatchers.

In 2018, Bellmartin participated in the Dutch TV Show The Voice Senior which he won. In this show he was coached by Gordon and Gerard Joling. After winning, Bellmartin was allowed to record an EP and perform live at the Ziggo Dome.

Death
He died on 28 May 2021, after a short illness.

References

External links
 
 

1949 births
2021 deaths
Dutch people of Indonesian descent
The Voice (franchise) winners
Moluccan people
People from Bogor
People from 's-Hertogenbosch
21st-century Dutch male singers
21st-century Dutch singers